The 2016 Sporting Kansas City season was the twenty-first season of the team's existence in Major League Soccer and the sixth year played under the Sporting Kansas City moniker.

Sporting Kansas City entered the season as the defending U.S. Open Cup champions. By winning the 2015 U.S. Open Cup, they were qualified for the 2016–17 CONCACAF Champions League for the third time in franchise history.

Squad

First team roster 
As of October 13, 2015.

Player movement

In

Out

Loans

In

Out

Competitions

Match results

Preseason

Desert Diamond Cup 

Kickoff times are in CST (UTC-06) unless shown otherwise

Major League Soccer

League table

Western Conference standings

Regular season 

Kickoff times are in CDT (UTC-05) unless shown otherwise

MLS Cup Playoffs

Knockout round

U.S. Open Cup 

Kickoff times are in CDT (UTC-05) unless shown otherwise

CONCACAF Champions League (2016–17)

Group stage

Kickoff times are in CDT (UTC-05) unless shown otherwise

References 

Sporting Kansas City seasons
Sporting Kansas City
Sporting Kansas City
Sporting Kansas City